As It Is in Heaven is a 2004 Swedish musical film directed by Kay Pollak and starring Michael Nyqvist and Frida Hallgren. It was a box office hit in Sweden and several other countries. It was nominated for Best Foreign Language Film at the Hollywood 77th Academy Awards.

Plot
Daniel Daréus (Michael Nyqvist) is a successful and renowned international conductor whose life aspiration is to create music that will open people's hearts. His own heart, however, is in bad shape. After suffering a heart attack on stage at the end of a performance, he retires indefinitely to Norrland in the far north of Sweden, to the village where he endured a terrible childhood of bullying.

Daniel buys the old elementary school in the village, and soon after is asked to come along one Thursday night and listen to the local choir. He is only asked to listen, and maybe offer some helpful advice, but their intentions of persuading him to help are obvious. He eventually agrees to help, albeit reluctantly. Daniel approaches the parish minister to seek for the position of cantor. He starts helping the choir grow and develop, rediscovering his own joy in music.

Almost immediately, Lena (Frida Hallgren), an attractive young girl in the choir, catches his attention. As they grow closer and fall in love, he realises that he is surrounded by the villagers' personal problems. Inger (Ingela Olsson) is married to the respected minister, Stig (Niklas Falk), but has failed to develop a loving sexual relationship with her husband. Siv (Ylva Lööf) is so obsessed with morality that she cannot enjoy herself. Arne (Lennart Jähkel) is so ambitious for the choir's success that he obsesses over tiny mistakes, failing to see that he is making bigger mistakes himself. Tore (André Sjöberg) is mentally handicapped and shunned but is eventually included in the choir; Holmfrid (Mikhael Rahm) has put up with being called "Fatso" by Arne since childhood and eventually stands up to him. Gabriella (Helen Sjöholm) is beaten and abused by her husband, Conny (Per Morberg), a fact that is known and ignored by the whole village. She eventually finds the strength to leave him, as the whole village finds its strength to help her. Conny himself turns out to be the bully who was at school with Daniel and drove him from the village. He blames the choir and Daniel for his wife's decision and beats him up. This lands Conny in jail. The minister, Stig, is jealous of the choir's success and tries to close it down. His failure precipitates his eventual nervous breakdown. The heart of each member of the choir starts to open, as it has always been Daniel's dream.

The choir is accepted into the annual "Let the Peoples Sing" competition (Arne has decided to register the choir without previous notice), and they journey to Innsbruck, Austria, to perform. Lena fears Daniel will leave her for his sophisticated friends from the music world, when she see their kissing and hugging him. He dares at last to tell her he loves her and then they make love. On the day of the competition, the choir is ready on stage but Daniel is nowhere to be seen. His heart has been affected by his anxiety, and he has another heart attack. Daniel staggers into the restroom, unsure of how to handle the situation, then stumbles and hits his head on the pipe below a sink, causing him to bleed severely. He lies helplessly on the tile, blood gushing from his head, listening to the choir harmonising over the loudspeakers. The audience in the auditorium is enchanted and sings along. Daniel smiles to himself and turns motionless, thus leaving the viewer to decide whether he lives or dies, completely fulfilled by reaching his goal.

The final scene shows Daniel rushing towards his younger self within the wheat fields as he embraces his life's goal, to "create music that will open a person's heart".

Cast
 Michael Nyqvist as Daniel Daréus
 Frida Hallgren as Lena
 Helen Sjöholm as Gabriella
 Lennart Jähkel as Arne
 Ingela Olsson as Inger
 Niklas Falk as Stig
 Per Morberg as Conny
 Ylva Lööf as Siv
 André Sjöberg as Tore
 Mikael Rahm as Holmfrid
 Barbro Kollberg as Olga
 Axelle Axell as Florence
 Lasse Petterson as Erik
 Ulla-Britt Norrman as Amanda

Release
As It Is in Heaven was particularly successful in Australia. The Hayden Orpheum in the Sydney suburb of Cremorne showed the film for 103 weeks (as of November 2008), making it one of the longest-running films in Australian history. By comparison, The Sound of Music ran in Adelaide for over three years. A celebration of the popularity and spirit of the film was held at the Orpheum in August 2007 with a concert of Scandinavian music including a finale of "Gabriella's Song" from the film. A recording of proceedings was made for the director Kay Pollak and, via a pre-recorded message to the audience, he thanked Sydneysiders for embracing the film so warmly.

It ran for 52 weeks in New Zealand and had good word-of-mouth audiences in Sweden, Germany and the Netherlands.

Reception

Critical response
As It Is in Heaven has an approval rating of 83% on review aggregator website Rotten Tomatoes, based on 6 reviews, and an average rating of 6.67/10.

Awards and nominations
The film was nominated for Best Foreign Language Film at the 77th Academy Awards. At the Swedish Guldbagge Awards it made history by being nominated in every possible category, while at the same time failing to win a single award.

Stage musical

A critically acclaimed stage musical adaptation of the film written by Carin and Kay Pollak, music by Fredrik Kempe and book by Kay Pollak,  Edward af Sillen and Carin Pollak opened at the Oscarsteatern in Stockholm on September 13, 2018. It has since been translated for other countries such as Germany and Norway.

Sequel
A stand-alone sequel, Heaven on Earth, also directed by Kay Pollak was released in 2015.

References

External links
 
 
 
 
 

2004 films
2000s musical drama films
2000s Swedish-language films
Swedish musical drama films
Films about classical music and musicians
Films directed by Kay Pollak
Films set in Sweden
2004 drama films
2000s Swedish films